The Development Bank of the Philippines (DBP) is a state-owned development bank headquartered in Makati, Philippines.

It was established after World War II in 1947 on the government's effort through its mandate to rebuild the country's war torned infrastructure.

It is the sixth-largest bank in the Philippines in terms of assets of more than P1.1-trillion as of March 2021. DBP is also the second-largest and one of the state-owned and controlled banks along with Land Bank of the Philippines (LBP), Overseas Filipino Bank (OFW Bank), and Al-Amanah Islamic Bank.

It has 131 branches and 12 branch lite units as of June 2022.

Background
Under its charter, DBP is classified as a development bank. It is primarily tasked to provide banking services to cater to the needs of agricultural and industrial enterprises. It may also perform all other functions of a thrift bank.

It focuses on four major areas of financing — infrastructure and logistics, social services, small and medium enterprises, and the environment.

It also offers deposit and investment products and services, trade products and services, treasury products and services, transfer and remittance services, among others.

As a GOCC (Government Operated and Controlled Corporation), DBP is required to declare and remit at least half of its annual net earnings to the National Government.

History
DBP's history can be traced back to the Commonwealth Era. In 1935, the National Loan and Investment Board (NLIB) was created to coordinate and manage various government trust funds such as the Postal Savings Fund and the Teacher's Retirement Fund.

In 1939, the NLIB was abolished and its functions were transferred to a new body, the Agricultural and Industrial Bank (AIB). AIB continued operations until the outbreak of World War II.

In 1947, the government created the Rehabilitation Finance Corporation (RFC) under R.A. No. 85 which absorbed the assets and took over the functions of the AIB. The RFC provided credit facilities for the development of agriculture, commerce and industry and the reconstruction of properties damaged by the war.

In 1958, the RFC was reorganized into the modern-day DBP. The change in corporate name marked the shift from rehabilitation to broader activities.

With an initial capital of P500-million, DBP set to work on expanding its facilities and operations to accelerate efforts towards promoting national economic development. The bank established a nationwide branch network and tapped local and foreign resources to complement its capital. It also borrowed money directly from international finance institutions.

In the late 1970s up to the early 1980s, however, its viability was undermined by numerous non-performing accounts.

In 1986, former Philippine President Corazon Aquino issued Executive Order No. 81, which reorganized the bank and gave it a new charter. All non-performing assets and liabilities were subsequently transferred to the government. DBP undertook an institutional strengthening program, including a thorough revision of its credit process, as well as employee training programs towards the intensive implementation of its new lending thrusts. DBP likewise reopened its lending windows for housing, agriculture and SMEs.

In 1995, DBP was granted an expanded banking license and attained universal banking status.

Former Philippine President Fidel Ramos signed Republic Act 8523 in 1998, amending DBP's 1986 charter. Among the major provisions incorporated in the new DBP charter were the increase of authorized capital stock from P5-billion to P35-billion, and the creation of the position of President and CEO.

In February 2016, former Philippine President Benigno Aquino III approved the merger of DBP with state-owned Land Bank of the Philippines, with pending approval from the Bangko Sentral ng Pilipinas and written consent of the Philippine Deposit Insurance Corporation.  However, as of September 2016, the proposed DBP-Landbank merger has been canceled for implementation by the Governance Commission for GOCCs (GCG).

Organization
The affairs and business of DBP are directed and its properties managed and preserved and its corporate powers exercised by a board of directors consisting of nine members, all appointed by the President of the Philippines. The term of office of the chairman, president and the members of the board of directors are for a period of one year or until such time as their successors are appointed.

The chairman of the board is appointed by the President of the Philippines from among the members of the board: provided, that the positions of chairman of the board and president of DBP are not to be held by the same person.

The DBP chairman presides at meetings of the board, while the president of the bank serves as vice-chairman of the board, and as such, assists the chairman and acts in his stead in case of absence or incapacity.

The chief executive officer of DBP is the president, who is elected by the board of directors from among themselves with the advice and consent of the President of the Philippines.  The DBP president shall, among other powers and duties, execute, carry out and administer the policies, measures, orders and resolutions approved by the board; direct and supervise the operation and administration of the bank; and exercise such other powers and perform such other functions or duties as may be assigned to him by law or by the board from time to time.

The DBP board of directors provides for an organization and staff of officers and employees of the bank and upon recommendation of the DBP president, fix their remuneration and other emoluments. All positions in the bank are governed by the compensation, position classification system and qualification standards approved by the DBP board of directors based on a comprehensive job analysis of actual duties and responsibilities.

Key officials
The key officials of the bank include:

 Dante O. Tiñga – Chairman
 Michael O. de Jesus – President and Chief Executive Officer
 Roberto V. Antonio – Director
 Maria Lourdes A. Arcenas – Director
 Rogelio V. Garcia – Director
 Emmeline C. David – Director
 Wilma T. Eisma- Director
 Consuelo N. Padilla – Director
 Jaime Z. Paz – Director

Subsidiaries
DBP subsidiaries and affiliates include:
 Al-Amanah Islamic Investment Bank of the Philippines
DBP Leasing Corporation
DBP Data Center, Inc.
DBP Management Corporation

See also

 List of banks in the Philippines
 Land Bank of the Philippines
 BancNet

External links
 DBP website

References

Banks of the Philippines
National development banks
Government-owned and controlled corporations of the Philippines
Companies based in Makati
Makati Central Business District